Albert Shawn Gilbert Jr. (born March 12, 1965, in Camden, New Jersey) is an American former professional baseball player. He attended Agua Fria Union High School in Avondale, Arizona. After high school, he attended Fresno State and Arizona State University.

Gilbert was drafted four times by three different teams-the Dodgers, Reds and Twins, however it was not until their second try the Twins were able to finally sign him in 1987.

The 5'9", 185 pound Gilbert was not too imposing (some sources say he was as small as 170 pounds), but he held his own in the minors by using his small stature to swipe 40 or more bases in 3 out of 4 seasons between 1988 and 1991. He also hit .372 in 43 at-bats with Visalia in 1988.

Gilbert, who batted and threw right-handed, made his major league debut on June 2, 1997.

Over the next few years, he bounced between the majors and minors but ended up swiping only 2 bases in 51 total major league games while hitting just .149.

An interesting fact about Gilbert's MLB career is in 51 games he only had 47 at-bats and scored more runs than he had actual hits. Rarely for someone to appear in 50 or more career games does anyone have more runs than hits and more games than at-bats. Two other examples of this are Charles Gipson and Glen Barker.

His last major league game was July 2, 2000, with the Dodgers.

Willie Banks, David West and Jarvis Brown had been teammates of Gilbert for four seasons, longer than any other teammates.

Gilbert is currently the head baseball coach at Servite High School in Anaheim, California.

References

External links

 Long Beach State bio

1965 births
Living people
Albuquerque Dukes players
American expatriate baseball players in Japan
Baseball players at the 1999 Pan American Games
Baseball coaches from New Jersey
Baseball players from Camden, New Jersey
Fresno State Bulldogs baseball players
Golden West Rustlers baseball players
High school baseball coaches in the United States
Kenosha Twins players
Las Vegas 51s players
Los Angeles Dodgers players
Major League Baseball infielders
Major League Baseball outfielders
Memphis Redbirds players
Nashville Sounds players
New York Mets players
Norfolk Tides players
Orlando Sun Rays players
Osaka Kintetsu Buffaloes players
Pan American Games medalists in baseball
Pan American Games silver medalists for the United States
People from Avondale, Arizona
Portland Beavers players
Scranton/Wilkes-Barre Red Barons players
Sportspeople from Camden, New Jersey
Sportspeople from the Phoenix metropolitan area
St. Louis Cardinals players
United States national baseball team players
Visalia Oaks players
Medalists at the 1999 Pan American Games
Anchorage Glacier Pilots players